Tyrie is a surname, and is less commonly used as a given name. Notable people with the surname name include:

Andrew Tyrie (born 1957), British politician
Andy Tyrie (born 1940), Ulster (Northern Ireland) loyalist
Harold Tyrie (1915–2007), New Zealand athlete
James Tyrie (1543–1597), Scottish Jesuit theologian
Kat Tyrie, Australian musician and engineer

See also
Tyree (disambiguation), includes list of people with surname Tyree